Onychomyrmex mjobergi is a species of ant in the genus Onychomyrmex. Endemic to Australia, it was described by Forel in 1915 from specimens found in Queensland.

References

External links

Amblyoponinae
Hymenoptera of Australia
Insects of Australia
Insects described in 1915